The Political Studies Review is an academic journal that publishes rather range of long short form articles, including: original research articles, review articles, early results, the null hypothesis, and symposia and new ideas in the field of political science and international relations. The journal also publishes book reviews".

According to the Journal Citation Reports, the journal has a 2020  impact factor of 3.241 and a 5-year impact factor of 2.298, and ranking it 43rd out of 183 journals in the category "Political Science".

See also 
 List of political science journals

References

English-language journals
Political science journals
Publications established in 2003
Quarterly journals
Academic journals associated with learned and professional societies of the United Kingdom